Outsource is a news publication on sourcing and shoring strategy. The magazine has a circulation verified by the ABC during January and December 2012 of 11,361 (average per issue) making it the first magazine in the outsourcing sector to achieve this audited status

Outsource is one of several of magazines published by EMP Media Ltd. It is a quarterly B2B title that has provided news on outsourcing since 2005

In February 2012 Outsource announced a partnership with the ACCA (Association of Chartered Certified Accountants), the global professional body for accountants.

In 2018 Outsource magazine changed its name to Future of Sourcing and transitioned to a digitally published platform.

References

External links
Future of Sourcing

2005 establishments in the United Kingdom
2018 disestablishments in the United Kingdom
Business magazines published in the United Kingdom
Defunct magazines published in the United Kingdom
Magazines established in 2005
Magazines disestablished in 2018
Online magazines with defunct print editions
Online magazines published in the United Kingdom
Outsourcing in the United Kingdom
Professional and trade magazines
Quarterly magazines published in the United Kingdom